Eileen Mary Guppy MBE (24 May 1903 – 8 March 1980) was a British geologist, petrologist, and analytical chemist. She was the first female geologist appointed to the scientific staff of the British Geological Survey and was the first female staff member to be awarded an MBE in 1966 for her 39 years of service to the Order of the British Empire.

Education and early career 

Guppy began studying at Bedford College in London in 1920. She graduated with honors in 1923 with a Bachelor of Science in Geology. For the next two years, she worked as a research assistant to Leonard Hawkes at Bedford College and published the paper A Composite Dyke from Eastern Iceland in the Quarterly Journal of the Geological Society of London. The article overviewed an Icelandish dyke in and it's composition, making insightful observations into its makeup.

Geological Survey career
In 1927, Eileen Guppy was appointed to the petrological department at the Geological Survey of Great Britain, making her one of two women with geology degrees to be appointed as technical assistants in that institution. Despite her qualifications, she spent many years working in roles subordinate to her male counterparts due to her gender.

By 1935, she was regarded of sufficient status to be given the task of organizing the move of the petrology rock and thin section collections from the old Museum of Practical Geology on Jermyn Street to the new Geological Museum on Exhibition Road.

In 1943, many women took on roles left absent by men as a result of the outbreak of World War II. Guppy was promoted to the rank of assistant geologist, becoming the first female geology graduate to be appointed to the scientific staff of the Survey. After the war ended in 1945, she was demoted to her earlier position of senior experimental officer because it was deemed that she had fulfilled her wartime role. She continued to work as a scientific assistant to the Survey's directors Sir William Pugh and Sir James Stubblefield until 1966.

Guppy later became a secretary for the new Atomic Energy Division, and she worked with the inspectors from the Public Record Office between 1963 and 1965 evaluating older records from the British Geological Survey and Museum. Upon her retirement in 1966, Guppy was awarded an MBE for her service of more than 39 years. She was the first female member of staff to be recognized in this way. Even though she had a 43-year long career, she was only officially recognized as a geologist for three of them. Most of her contributions to various British Geological Survey publications have little credit attributed to her.

Publications
Guppy published her field work in 1924 under the title of A Composite Dyke from Eastern Iceland, which she formed while partnered with geologist Leonard Hawkes. She published two editions of Chemical Analysis of Igneous Rocks, Metamorphic Rocks and Minerals in 1931 and 1956. While working for the Director Sir John Flett, she made a significant contribution to the book The First Hundred Years of the Geological Survey of Great Britain, published in 1937. Her work listed the contributing staff on the British Geological Survey from 1835 to 1935. She published the book Rock Wool with James Phemister in 1945, with a second edition released in 1949.

A Composite Dyke from Eastern Iceland

Alongside her scientific partner Leonard Hawkes, Guppy composed a case study on the composite dykes of eastern Iceland in the year of 1924. Although Hawkes conducted the field work himself, Guppy played a crucial role in assisting and co-operating with deciphering the commonly occurring composite dykes in the tertiary plateau-basalt series of the respective area studied. The overruling findings are as follows: the exposed dyke is seen to be composed of basic and acidic rocks, as well as seven members - the dolerites alternating in the quartz-porphyries. The studied dyke is exposed in cliff-section, which is 2400 feet in vertical height at Hökulvikurgil, Breithdal. Guppy and Hawkes were also able to correctly decipher the sequence of intrusions in the composite dyke. Furthermore, analyses of the origin of quartz and felspar-xenocrysts in the dolerites were made in addition to the origins of the basic inclusions in the acidic rocks.

Personal life
In the early 20th century, British institutions mandated that females be single or widowed to be employed; if they decided to marry or remarry, they had to resign. This  meant that she had to stay unmarried to retain her position working for the Geological Survey. This law changed in 1975, when the Sex Discrimination Act 1975 was introduced.

Impact 
Guppy was the first female geologist to be appointed to the scientific staff of the British Geological Survey, paving the way for other women in that institution. She also was the first female staff member to be made member of the Order of the British Empire in 1966, making her an important footnote in feminist history.

Her career was part of a large-scale societal shift in Western attitudes toward legitimizing female scientists, that took place during the 1920-30s. This shift was due in part to the founding of female post-secondary institutions a few decades prior, such as Bedford College where Ms. Guppy attended; vacancies in scientific positions as a result of WWII; and the first-wave feminist movement, which prompted organizations to step towards accepting women as equals with their male counterparts in the workplace.

See also
 Timeline of women in science
 British Geological Survey

References

1903 births
1980 deaths
20th-century British geologists
British women geologists
Members of the Order of the British Empire
20th-century British women scientists
Alumni of Bedford College, London